Fabienne Peter is a British philosopher and professor of philosophy at the University of Warwick. She is a former head of the Department of Philosophy (2017-2020); succeeded by current head, Guy Longworth. 
Peter has held a Leverhulme Research Fellowship and is known for her works on political philosophy, moral philosophy, and social epistemology.
She is a former editor of Economics and Philosophy and a former associate editor of the Journal of Applied Philosophy.

Books
Democratic Legitimacy, Routledge, 2008
Rationality and Commitment, edited with Hans Bernhard Schmid, Oxford University Press, 2007
Public Health, Ethics, and Equity, edited with Sudhir Anand and Amartya Sen, Oxford University Press, 2004

References

External links
Fabienne Peter at the University of Warwick

British philosophers
British expatriates in Switzerland
Philosophy academics
Living people
Academics of the University of Warwick
University of St. Gallen alumni
University of Basel alumni
Academic staff of the University of Basel
Year of birth missing (living people)